A list of films produced in Italy in 1965 (see 1965 in film):

See also 
1965 in Italian television

References

Footnotes

Sources

External links
Italian films of 1965 at the Internet Movie Database

Lists of 1965 films by country or language
1965
Films